O-Mustard (T) is a vesicant chemical weapon, a type of mustard gas, with around 3 times the toxicity of the original sulfur mustard. It was developed in England in the 1930s as a thickener for mustard gas to make it more persistent when used in warm climates. A mixture of 60% sulfur mustard and 40% O-mustard also has a lower freezing point than pure sulfur mustard, and was given the code name HT. O-mustard is a Schedule I substance under the Chemical Weapons Convention.

See also
 Bis(chloromethyl) ether
 HN3 (nitrogen mustard)
 Lewisite
 Selenium mustard
 Sesquimustard

References

Sulfur mustards
Blister agents
Chloroethyl compounds